Hanam is a city in Gyeonggi Province, South Korea.  Formerly a part of Gwangju County, it was designated a city in 1989.  The ancient Baekje capital of Hanam Wiryeseong may have been located there.

Lying immediately east of Seoul, Hanam is also bordered by Namyangju, Gwangju, and Seongnam.

Administrative divisions
Hanam is divided as follows:
 Cheonhyun-dong (천현동)
Shinjang1-dong(신장1동)
Shinjang2-dong(신장2동)
Deokpung1-dong (덕풍1동)
Deokpung2-dong (덕풍2동)
Deokpung3-dong (덕풍3동)
Pungsan-dong (풍산동)
Misa1-dong(미사1동)
Misa2-dong(미사2동)
Gambuk-dong(감북동)
Gami-dong(감이동)
Wyrye-dong(위례동)
Chungung-dong (춘궁동)
Choi-dong (초이동)

Statistics

Climate
Hanam has a humid continental climate (Köppen: Dwa), but can be considered a borderline humid subtropical climate (Köppen: Cwa) using the  isotherm.

Sister cities
  Rushan, Shandong, China
  Little Rock, Arkansas, United States
  Shah Alam, Selangor, Malaysia

See also
 List of cities in South Korea
 Geography of South Korea
 Seoul Capital Area

References

External links
 City government website 
  City Council website 

 

 
Cities in Gyeonggi Province